The Prishtina Book Fair is an annual book fair held in the Prishtina, capital of Kosovo. The event is traditional organization and the participation of Kosovo's publishers with common stand at the fair on the world renowned - Frankfurt Book Fair. So far, there, at the Palace of Youth and Sports have been organized book fairs, every year. The first book fair took place on 17 to 22 November 1999 but others were organized during May and/or June. The number of participants is about 100 publishers, mostly from Kosovo, Albania, North Macedonia, Montenegro, Diaspora, etc.

There is a fairly high number of books that are published mainly from Kosovan, Albanian, Macedonian and Montenegrins publishers and some foreign publishers (German, French, English etc.). The Book Fair in Prishtina is one of the most significant events in Kosovo, and it is an important place where intellectuals and all other people promote the idea and the need on developing and affirming genuine values, as well as sound debates regarding books and writings.

See also 
 Prishtina
 Fairs in Prishtina
 Culture in Prishtina

References

External links 
 PRISHTINA, CAPITAL OF BOOK FOR FIVE DAYS
 The Book Fair in Prishtina, an event where genuine literary values are affirmed
 A book fair in Kosovo's capital of Prishtina 
 Prishtina Book Fair open (Gazeta Express) 
 Prishtina Book Fair opens (Sada El Baladi) 
 Prishtina's International Book Fair Opens (Photo)

Events in Pristina
Pristina
Annual events in Kosovo